Esbjerg Stadionhal was an indoor arena located in Esbjerg, Denmark. It opened in 1968 and had a capacity of 2,100 people. Its primary tenant was Team Esbjerg. It also hosted non-sporting events such as exhibitions, fairs and concerts. In 2012 it was replaced by Blue Water Dokken.

References

See also
 Blue Water Arena
 Esbjerg Skøjtehal

Indoor arenas in Denmark
Handball venues in Denmark
Buildings and structures in Esbjerg
Sports venues in the Region of Southern Denmark
Defunct indoor arenas